California Home+Design is a multi-platform media brand that covers home, architecture, products, art and lifestyle stories throughout the state of California. California Home+Design magazine is distributed quarterly. The audience for California Home + Design extends from Sacramento to San Diego and exceeds 600,000.

California Home+Design was founded in the mid-1990s by Sloane Citron and Elsie Floriani of 18media under the name of California Home & Gardens. In 2004 McEvoy Media, then Hartle Media, acquired a majority interest in the publication and changed the name to California Home+Design and californiahomedesign.com. This act was later followed by the acquisition of Spin magazine by McEvoy Media.  McEvoy Media also produced 7x7 magazine and is a part of the McEvoy Group which also own publishing house Chronicle Books.

In 2014, McEvoy shut down the brand and sold it to a former staff member for a relaunch.

References

External links
 Official website

Mass media companies of the United States